Gaye Lynette Horne (née McDermit, born 9 May 1945) is a former New Zealand fencer who won two bronze medals representing her country at the 1966 British Empire and Commonwealth Games.

Biography
Born on 9 May 1945, McDermit finished as runner-up in the women's foil at the 1965 New Zealand national fencing championships. The same year, she was part of the New Zealand team that competed against Australia. 

At the time of the 1966 British Empire and Commonwealth Games, McDermit was working as a typist. At those games, she represented New Zealand in both the women's individual and teams foil events. She won a bronze medal in the individual foil, and then won a second bronze alongside Pam French and Joyce Fenton in the team event.

McDermitt also competed in the individual and team foil events again at the 1970 British Commonwealth Games in Edinburgh, but was unplaced.

References

External links
 

1945 births
Living people
Sportspeople from Auckland
New Zealand female foil fencers
Fencers at the 1966 British Empire and Commonwealth Games
Fencers at the 1970 British Commonwealth Games
Commonwealth Games bronze medallists for New Zealand
Commonwealth Games medallists in fencing
Medallists at the 1966 British Empire and Commonwealth Games